Mirco Lipari (born 19 July 2002) is an Italian professional footballer who plays as forward for  club Juventus Next Gen.

Club career

Youth 
Lipari started his youth career at Polisportiva Palazzaccio and Cecina, before moving to Empoli. In 2018, Lipari joined Juventus, starting his experience with the under-16s with whom he scored 20 goals in 24 appearances. He returned to Empoli on loan in 2019, playing with the Primavera (under-19s); he scored 16 goals and made five assists in 42 appearances in two years and won the league in 2021.

Senior 
On 25 August 2021, Lipari moved to Juve Stabia on loan. Lipari only made seven appearances with them, before his loan was interrupted on 27 January 2022. Lipari debutted with Juventus U23 — the reserve team of Juventus — on 16 March in a 2–1 defeat against Lecco.

International career 
Lipari has rappresented Italy at under-15, under-16 and under-17.

Style of play 
Lipari is a versatile offensive player who can play as left forward.

Career statistics

References

Notelist 

2002 births
Living people
Italian footballers
Association football forwards
Empoli F.C. players
Juventus F.C. players
S.S. Juve Stabia players
Juventus Next Gen players
Serie C players
Italy youth international footballers
Sportspeople from the Province of Livorno
Footballers from Tuscany
People from Cecina, Tuscany
21st-century Italian people